Avatar Country is the seventh studio album by Swedish metal band Avatar, released on 12 January 2018.

Background 
The band recorded their seventh studio album throughout Summer 2017 at Spinroad Studios in Lindome, Sweden. The album was produced by Jay Ruston, noted for working with Stone Sour, Anthrax and Steel Panther. Keyboards and orchestral arrangements were provided by Aron Parmerud.

Avatar took part in the Avatar Country World Tour 2017, touring the United States from January to February 2018, and various countries in Europe from March to April, with The Brains and freakshow attraction Hellzapoppin'. Just one night before the album's release, in New York City, Avatar performed six songs from the album for the first time, along with songs from their previous albums.

Song information 
Avatar released music videos for three songs on the album; "A Statue of the King" on 24 October 2017, "The King Wants You" on 19 December 2017, and "The King Welcomes You to Avatar Country" on 23 May 2018. All three videos were directed by longtime collaborator Johan Carlén.

Avatar also called the opening track, "Glory to Our King", the album's "national anthem". Notably, every song on the track listing has the word "King" in its name.

Track listing

Personnel

Avatar 
Johannes Eckerström – lead vocals
Jonas "Kungen" Jarlsby – guitar
Tim Öhrström – guitar, backing vocals
Henrik Sandelin – bass, backing vocals
John Alfredsson – drums

Charts

References 

2018 albums
Avatar (Swedish band) albums